The Tower of Castagna is a ruined Genoese tower located in the commune of Coti-Chiavari on the west coast of Corsica.

The tower was built in around 1600. It was one of a series of coastal defences constructed by the Republic of Genoa between 1530 and 1620 to stem the attacks by Barbary pirates.

See also
List of Genoese towers in Corsica

References

Towers in Corsica